Richard Deschatelets (born 4 April 1954) is a Canadian wrestler. He competed in the men's freestyle 82 kg at the 1976 Summer Olympics.

References

1954 births
Living people
Canadian male sport wrestlers
Olympic wrestlers of Canada
Wrestlers at the 1976 Summer Olympics
Commonwealth Games medallists in wrestling
Commonwealth Games gold medallists for Canada
Wrestlers at the 1982 Commonwealth Games
Pan American Games medalists in wrestling
Pan American Games silver medalists for Canada
Pan American Games bronze medalists for Canada
Wrestlers at the 1975 Pan American Games
Wrestlers at the 1979 Pan American Games
Wrestlers at the 1983 Pan American Games
People from West Nipissing
Sportspeople from Ontario
Medalists at the 1975 Pan American Games
Medalists at the 1979 Pan American Games
20th-century Canadian people
21st-century Canadian people
Medallists at the 1978 Commonwealth Games
Medallists at the 1982 Commonwealth Games